Centesimo (plural centesimi) is the Italian word for "cent", derived from the Latin centesimus meaning "hundredth". In Italy it was the  division of the Italian lira.

Currencies that have centesimo as subunits include:

Circulating
 Swiss franc (in Italian, see Rappen)
 Euro cent (in Italian, see Cent (currency))

Obsolete

 Italian lira
 Papal lira
 Parman lira
 Sammarinese lira
 Sardinian lira
 Vatican lira

References 

Coins of Italy